The eighth season of Bachelor in Paradise premiered on September 27, 2022. In May 2022, Jesse Palmer was announced as the host.

Production 
As with the previous season, filming took place in the town of Sayulita, located in Vallarta-Nayarit, Mexico. This marked the first season not to premiere in the usual summer schedule.

After the second rose ceremony, a twist similar to Casa Amor from Love Island was introduced. The men and women were separated by gender and each introduced to a new group of the opposite sex - after several days, they had to decide whether to bring a new person back to Paradise, or return alone in the hopes of reconnecting with their original partner.

Casting 
On May 17, 2022, Jesse Palmer became the new host of the series, replacing long-time host Chris Harrison; and Wells Adams was confirmed to be returning as the bartender for the fifth season in a row. 

On August 26, 2022, the first 19 contestants were revealed. On August 29, 2022, Victoria Fuller was announced as a contestant during the Bachelorette season 19 Men Tell All special, although she did not arrive on the first day. On September 6, 2022, Johnny DePhillipo was announced as a contestant shortly after his elimination in The Bachelorette.

This season featured two international contestants - Florence Moerenhout from The Bachelor and Bachelor in Paradise Australia, and Adam Todd from The Bachelorette Australia. This was the first time that international contestants have appeared in the American franchise since season 5.

Contestants

Elimination table

Key 

  The contestant is male
  The contestant is female
  The contestant went on a date and gave out a rose at the rose ceremony
  The contestant went on a date and got a rose at the rose ceremony
  The contestant gave or received a rose at the rose ceremony, thus remaining in the competition
  The contestant received the last rose
  The contestant went on a date and received the last rose
  The contestant went on a date and was eliminated
  The contestant was eliminated
  The contestant had a date and voluntarily left the show
  The contestant voluntarily left the show
  The contestant was medically evacuated.
  The couple broke up and was eliminated
  The couple had a date, then broke up and was eliminated
  The couple decided to stay together and won the competition
  The contestant had to wait before appearing in paradise
 The couple split, but later got back together.
 The couple left together to pursue a relationship.

Episodes

Notes

References

External links 
 

The Bachelor (franchise) seasons
Television shows set in Mexico
2022 American television seasons